Terry Gayle Kirby (born January 20, 1970) is a former professional American football player who played ten seasons in the National Football League (NFL) from 1993 to 2002.  A 6'1" running back from the University of Virginia, he is the younger brother of former Major League Baseball player Wayne Kirby. Co Owner of Ultimate Sports Institute in Weston, Florida and now is a coach for the Weston Warriors. He also won the Superhole III cornhole champion in 2022

High school
Kirby played high school football at Tabb High School in York County, Virginia, leading his team to a state championship in 1987. He was selected to Parade'''s All-America team and the USA Today'' All-USA team after his senior year in 1988. As of 2014, he holds the Virginia High School League records for most 100-yard rushing games, career (36), most consecutive 100-yard games (26), and career rushing attempts (995). He ranks fourth in career points scored, third in career touchdowns, and second in career rushing yards with 7,428. In 2007, he was inducted into the Virginia High School League Hall of Fame.

Also a standout high school basketball player, his 2,246 career points rank 17th on the all-time VHSL scoring list. Participating in the 1988 Arby's Classic, he holds the tournament records for most field-goal attempts, game (33), and most field-goal attempts, tournament (105).

College career
Kirby played running back for the University of Virginia from 1989 to 1992, finishing his career as the school's all-time leader in rushing yards (3,348), a mark that has since been eclipsed by Tiki Barber and Thomas Jones.  He led the Atlantic Coast Conference (ACC) in rushing in 1990 and 1992. He led his team in receptions his junior and senior seasons and ranks fifth in career all-purpose yards at UVA.

Professional career
Kirby was drafted by the Miami Dolphins in 1993. His best year as a pro came during the 1996 season as a member of the San Francisco 49ers, when he started 10 games and rushed for 559 yards on 134 carries. He finished his NFL career with 2,875 rushing yards, 3,222 receiving yards and 43 total touchdowns (including three kickoff returns and one punt return for touchdown). He also completed 4 passes on 6 attempts in his career, with three touchdowns and no interceptions.

Kirby broke his ankle in 2002 in a Week 7 contest against the San Diego Chargers. He left the game on a cart with his leg in an aircast.

Following his NFL career, Kirby worked as a personal trainer.

Camp Wekeela
Kirby spends his summers working with children at Camp Wekeela. He dedicates his time to teach special programs like tackle football, strength and fitness and speed training.

NFL career statistics

Regular season

Postseason

References

1970 births
Living people
American men's basketball players
American football running backs
Cleveland Browns players
Miami Dolphins players
Oakland Raiders players
San Francisco 49ers players
Virginia Cavaliers football players
Virginia Cavaliers men's basketball players
Sportspeople from Hampton, Virginia
People from York County, Virginia
Players of American football from Virginia
Basketball players from Virginia
Tabb High School alumni